Thābit ibn Qays ibn Shammās al-Ḥārithī al-Khazrajī (Arabic: ثابت بن قيس بن شماس الحارثي الخزرجي) was a companion of Muhammad, who served as one of his orators and scribes, and a leader of the Ansar, the natives of Medina who gave Muhammad safe haven in their city and were among the earliest converts to Islam.

Following the Muslim victory at Dhu al-Qassah at the beginning of the Ridda wars in 632, Caliph Abu Bakr appointed Thabit commander of the Ansarite troops. He was placed under the overall command of Khalid ibn al-Walid. He participated in the subsequent battles of Buzakha (632) against the Asad and Ghatafan nomads under Tulayha and Aqraba (633) against the sedentary Hanifa tribe under Musaylima. At Aqraba he recommended to Khalid that the exclusion of nomad contingents in their army as he blamed them for the repeated, failed attempts to overcome the Hanifa warriors. Khalid accepted this counsel and the Muslims afterward routed and killed Musaylima,  and Thabit was killed during fight in the Battle of Yamama.

Alternatively, Chinese Muslims hold that he was involved in the introduction of Islam to China during the Tang dynasty period when he reached China over land and died of in the western Chinese province of Xinjiang.

The title of Khatib of Islam
The title "Khatib-e-Islam" was first used for Hazrat Thabit bin Qais Ansari, who used to attend various meetings as a representative of Muhammad. He was also remembered by the titles of Khatib-ul-Ansar and Khatib-e-Rasool-e-Karim.

References

Bibliography

Companions of the Prophet
Ansar (Islam)
People of the Ridda Wars